Olga Duque de Ospina (died 16 September 2019) was a Colombian politician who served as  Governor of Huila, Senator, and Minister of Education.

References

Date of birth missing
2019 deaths
Colombian politicians